Season one of the 2010 edition of El Gran Show premiered on April 15, 2010.

On August 7, 2010, Gisela Ponce de León and her dreamer Rayder Vásquez became champions of the season, fulfilling the dream of helping Grace, a woman from Ica with a congenital disease. Jesús Neyra and Cindy Tello finished second, while Maricarmen Marín and Diego Alza were third.

Cast

Couples
The celebrities were announced at a press conference on Thursday, April 29, while the dreamers were announced at the show's first week.

During the show, two celebrities left the competition. First it was Tilsa Lozano, who suffered an injury in the rehearsals, so Pierina Carcelén came into place from week 4. The second was Roberto Martínez, who suffered a muscle tear, so that former contestant José Luis "Puma" Carranza replaced him in week 11.

Hosts and judges
Gisela Valcárcel was the host and Aldo Díaz and Cristian Rivero were the co-hosts, while Morella Petrozzi, Carlos Alcántara and Pachi Valle Riestra were the judges, along with a VIP Jury composed of members of the audience.

Scoring charts

Red numbers indicate the sentenced for each week
Green numbers indicate the best steps for each week
 the couple was eliminated that week
 the couple was safe in the duel
 the couple was safe with the faith balls
 the winning couple
 the runner-up couple
 the third-place couple

Average score chart
This table only counts dances scored on a 40-point scale.

Highest and lowest scoring performances
The best and worst performances in each dance according to the judges' 40-point scale are as follows:

Couples' highest and lowest scoring dances
Scores are based upon a potential 40-point maximum.

Weekly scores 
Individual judges' scores in the charts below (given in parentheses) are listed in this order from left to right: Morella Petrozzi, Cárlos Alcántara, Pachi Valle Riestra, VIP Jury.

Week 1: Pachanga 
The couples danced the pachanga. No couple was sentenced in this week.
Running order

Week 2: Cumbia 
The couples danced the cumbia.
Running order

Public's favorite couple: Roberto & Katia (2 pts).

Week 3: Latin Pop 
The couples (except those sentenced) danced latin pop.
Running order

 Public's favorite couple: Roberto & Katia (2 pts)
*The duel
Fernando & Jessenia: Safe
Leonard & Gisela: Eliminated

Week 4: Trío Salsa & Strip Dance Under the Rain 
The couples (except those sentenced) were divided into two sets, the heroes and their dreamers danced trio salsa with a celebrity while heroines and their dreamers danced strip dance under the rain, the couple with the lowest score in each dance style was sentenced. In the danceathon the couples danced cumbia.

Due to an injury, Tilsa Lozano could not dance with Claussen Orbe, so Pierina Carcelén enters her place from this week.
Running order

 Public's favorite couple: Roberto & Katia (2 pts)
*The duel
Renato & Rosa Amelia: Eliminated
Vanessa & Kenny: Safe

Week 5: World Dances & Reggaetón Under the Rain 
The couples (except those sentenced) were divided into two sets, the heroines and their dreamers danced the world dances while heroes and their dreamers danced reggaeton under the rain, the couple with the lowest score in each dance style was sentenced. In the danceathon the couples danced cumbia.
Running order

 Public's favorite couple: Roberto & Katia (2 pts)
*The duel
Adriana & Renzo: Eliminated
Roberto & Katia: Safe

Week 6: Disco 
The couples danced disco (except those sentenced), a team dance of jazz and a danceathon of festejo.
Running order

 Public's favorite couple: Roberto & Katia (2 pts)
*The duel
Maricarmen & Diego: Safe
Fernando & Jessenia: Safe
(The two couples were saved by the faith balls)

Week 7: Merengue 
The couples danced merengue (except those sentenced), a team dance of jazz and a danceathon of salsa.
Running order

 Public's favorite couple: Roberto & Katia (2 pts)
*The duel
Roberto & Katia: Safe
Fernando & Jessenia: Safe
(The two couples were saved by the faith balls)

Week 8: Salsa 
The couples (except those sentenced) danced salsa. In the versus the couples danced mambo.
Running order

 Public's favorite couple: Roberto & Katia (2 pts)
*The duel
Fernando & Jessenia: Eliminated
Roberto & Katia: Safe

Week 9: The Pop Divas 
The couples danced pop. In the versus the couples danced pachanga.
Running order

 Public's favorite couple: Roberto & Katia (2 pts)
*The duel
Pierina & Claussen: Eliminated
Roberto & Katia: Safe

Week 10: Hip-hop/Guaracha 
Individual judges' scores in the charts below (given in parentheses) are listed in this order from left to right: Carlos Alcántara, Pachi Valle Riestra, Stuart Bishop, VIP Judge.

The couples danced hip-hop (except those sentenced), guaracha and a danceathon of cumbia.
Running order

 Public's favorite couple: Jonathan & Kiara (2 pts)
*The duel
Vanessa & Kenny: Eliminated
Roberto & Katia: Safe

Week 11: Quarterfinals 
The couples danced tex-mex (except those sentenced), a peruvian dance and a danceathon of festejo.

Due to an injury, Roberto Martínez was unable to perform, so Katia Monroy danced with former contestant José Luis "El Puma" Carranza instead.
Running order

 Public's favorite couple: Jonathan & Kiara (2 pts)
*The duel
Jesús & Cindy: Safe
El Puma & Katia: Eliminated

Week 12: Semifinal 
Individual judges' scores in the chart below (given in parentheses) are listed in this order from left to right: Marco Zunino, Pachi Valle Riestra, Stuart Bishop, VIP Judge

The couples danced jive, axé  (except those sentenced), a team dance of salsa and a danceathon  of cumbia.
Running order

 Public's favorite couple: Gisela & Rayder (2 pts).
*The duel
Jesús & Cindy: Safe
Jonathan & Kiara: Eliminated

Week 13:Final 
Individual judges' scores in the charts below (given in parentheses) are listed in this order from left to right: Morella Petrozzi, Marco Zunino, Pachi Valle Riestra, VIP Judge

On the first part, the sentenced couples danced cumbia and a mix dance (cha-cha-cha/salsa/quebradita).

On the second part, the final two couples danced a one unlearned dance and quickstep.

Running order (Part 1)

Running order (Part 2)

Dance chart
The celebrities and their dreamers will dance one of these routines for each corresponding week:
 Week 1: Pachanga (Pachanga)
 Week 2: Cumbia (Cumbia)
 Week 3: Latin pop (Latin Pop)
 Week 4: Trío salsa or strip dance under the rain & the danceathon (Trio Salsa/Strip Dance Under the Rain)
 Week 5: World dances or reggaeton under the rain & the danceathon (World Dances/Reggaetón Under the rain)
 Week 6: Disco, team dances & the danceathon (Disco)
 Week 7: Merengue, team dances & the danceathon (Merengue)
 Week 8: Salsa & the versus (Salsa)
 Week 9: Pop & the versus (The Pop Divas)
 Week 10: Hip-hop, guaracha & the danceathon (Hip-hop/Guaracha)
 Week 11: Peruvian dances, tex-mex & the danceathon (Quarterfinals)
 Week 12: Jive, axé, team dances & the danceathon (Semifinal)
 Week 13: Cumbia, mix (cha-cha-cha/salsa/quebradita), one unlearned dance & quickstep (Finals)

 Highest scoring dance
 Lowest scoring dance
 Gained bonus points for winning this dance
 Gained no bonus points for losing this dance
In italic indicate the dance performed in the duel

References

External links

2010 Peruvian television seasons
El Gran Show
Reality television articles with incorrect naming style